The Terre Haute Ordnance Depot was a World War II-era U.S. supply depot located in Terre Haute, Indiana.

History
Construction on the Terre Haute Ordnance Depot began on June 4, 1942. It was one of two ordnance depots activated in Vigo County, Indiana that year. The depot was completed on December 4, 1942 at a cost of $5.6 million.

Mission
The Terre Haute Ordnance Depot was mostly a warehouse complex engaged in various activities. The work at Terre Haute included storing spare parts, repairing transport vehicles, and shipping supplies to other military installations.

See also
Vigo Ordnance Plant

References

Closed installations of the United States Army
Buildings and structures in Terre Haute, Indiana
Indiana in World War II